"Hold On" is a song by British MC Skepta. It was released on 1 January 2012, as a digital download on iTunes in the United Kingdom. It was released as an EP for Skepta and didn't take part in any album features.

Music video
A music video to accompany the release of "Hold On" was first released onto YouTube on 2 October 2011, at a total length of three minutes and fifteen seconds.

Live performances
Skepta performed a live special acoustic version of the song when he visited The Wrap Up at MTV.

Song Credits
"Hold on" samples a riff from the song "Jacuzzi Suzy" by the Icelandic rock band Brain Police. According to an interview with Jakob Frímann Magnússon, the head of the Icelandic music composers association, the riff was used without permission and Brain Police's label, Small Stone Records has their lawyer looking into the matter.

Track listings

Chart performance

Weekly charts

Release history

References

2012 singles
Skepta songs
2011 songs
All Around the World Productions singles
Songs written by Skepta
Songs written by Nick Atkinson
3 Beat Records singles